is a railway station on the Sasshō Line in Nishi-ku, Sapporo, Hokkaido, Japan, operated by the Hokkaido Railway Company (JR Hokkaido). The station is numbered G03.

Lines

Station layout
The elevated station has two side platforms serving two tracks. The station has automated ticket machines, automated turnstiles which accept Kitaca, and a "Midori no Madoguchi" staffed ticket office.

Platforms

History
The station opened on 3 November 1988.

References

External links

 Station information and map 

Railway stations in Sapporo
Railway stations in Japan opened in 1988
Stations of Hokkaido Railway Company